This is a list of software tools and web portals used for gene prediction.

See also 
 Gene prediction
 List of RNA structure prediction software
 Comparison of software for molecular mechanics modeling

References 

Prediction
gene prediction software